Aixam-Mega is a French automobile manufacturer based in Aix-les-Bains, Savoie. It was founded in 1983 to make microcars following the acquisition of Arola. On 11 April 2013, US based Polaris Industries announced that it had acquired Aixam-Mega from previous owners Axa Private Equity.

History

The company can trace its history back to the establishment of Arola in 1975, which was acquired by Aixam in 1983 out of administration. In 1984 Aixam launched the new 325D, followed by the 400D in 1985.

In 1992 they started making a range of standard sized cars under the Mega brand, but by 2002 this brand was just being applied to a diesel and electric range of microvans and light utility vehicles.

The company currently produces the Aixam A.7XX series (powered by Kubota diesel engines), a microcar comparable with the Smart.

In Britain they are classified as a category L7e quadricycle (quad bike) because of their weight and power output. This requires a category B1 licence to legally drive them. In January 2013, the law changed such that special restricted low power versions of the car (Aixam 400) can now be driven by full AM licence holders in the UK.

In 2006 Mega launched the electric Mega City at the British International Motor Show and in 2009 acquired the assets of NICE Car Company, which had gone into administration in 2008.

Aixam mechanics
The Aixam 400, 500 and 500.5 are very basic vehicles mechanically by today's standards. There were a variety of engines offered over the years. The petrol versions used a Lombardini 505 cc twin-cylinder of approx , later petrol cars were fitted with fuel-injection.

Steering is by rack and pinion and has a comparatively low ratio. MacPherson strut suspension is used at the front and semi-trailing arms at the rear. Brakes are by disc and single-piston calipers at the front, with drums at the rear also serving for handbrake function, via cables.

Transmission is by a continuously-variable transmission (CVT) made and supplied by CVTech-IBC. The reversing gearbox and combined differential unit of 8:1 forward ratio, is supplied by the Italian company COMEX, which also supplies many of the other running-gear, steering, suspension and braking system components.

Models

Current

Minauto range
 Minauto Access
 Minauto GT
 Minauto Cross

Emotion range
 City Pack
 City Sport
 City GTO
 Coupé Evo
 Coupé Premium
 Coupé GTI
 Crossline Evo
 Crossover Premium

eAixam range
 e-City Sport
 e-Coupé Premium
 e-Coupé GTI
 e-Crossover Premium

Aixam Pro utility vehicles
 D-Truck Drop Side
 D-Truck Van
 e-Truck Drop Side
 e-Truck Van

Future

Mega
 Mega e-Scouty (from 2023)

Former

Aixam
 Aixam 300, 400, 500
 Aixam A540, A550
 Aixam A.721
 Aixam A.741
 Aixam A.751
 Aixam Berlines
 Aixam MAC (1997)
 Aixam Microcar
 Aixam Minivan
 Aixam Pick-Up
 Aixam Roadline
 Aixam Scouty
 Aixam Scouty-R

Mega
 Mega City
 Mega Club/Ranch - Citroën AX-based beach cars and offroad vehicles
 Mega Concept
 Mega Monte Carlo
 Mega Moskito Micro
 Mega Multitruck
  (1992)
 Mega e-Worker

See also 
 Renault Kangoo Z.E.
 Tazzari Zero

References

External links

 Aixam official website
 Mega official website
 Goupil electric vehicles a sister company

PSA Group
Vehicle manufacturing companies established in 1983
French companies established in 1983
Car manufacturers of France
Microcars
Electric vehicle manufacturers of France
French brands
Quadricycles
Aix-les-Bains
2013 mergers and acquisitions
Contract vehicle manufacturers